The Professional Dart Players Association (PDPA) is an organisation for professional dart players within the Professional Darts Corporation (PDC). Its intention is to look after the interests of all professional players through an annually elected Board of six current professionals. They work in partnership with the PDC (Promoter) and its governing body (DRA)

Formation
The PDPA was initially formed in the early 1980s with the main protagonists being John Lowe, Cliff Lazarenko, Dave Whitcombe and Tony Brown. As darts was beginning to decline, players from the PDPA eventually set up the World Darts Council (which is now the Professional Darts Corporation) to run their own tournaments. The PDPA remained effectively a players union.

Current board and fees
The six board members are Peter Manley (chairman), Alan Warriner-Little (ceo), Andrew Scott and Jacques Nieuwlaat. With administrative and secretarial support from Zoe Banks.

Membership of the PDPA is open to all players of the appropriate standard, but have to first enter its annual Qualifying School every January to try and win a PDC Tour Card. The initial joining fee for Qualifying School is £250 with an upgrade fee of £250 if a Tour Card is won (full membership is £500). There are around 600 members of the PDPA, with 128 Tour Card Holders, 350 Associate Members, 200 Youth Members and 200 European Day Member's. All Tour Card Holders have the right to qualify and play in PDC Premier televised tournaments with other members via qualifiers or related merit tables.

The William Hill World Darts Championship, Ladbrokes World Series and bwin Grand Slam of Darts have qualifiers which are exclusive to Tour Card Holders with all PDPA members eligible to play in the PDC World Darts Championship qualifier.

References

External links
PDPA web site
PDC web site
DRA web site
PDC Europe web site

Darts organizations
Sports trade unions
Professional Darts Corporation